Krzysztof Kciuk  (born 11 June 1980) is a Polish technology specialist and professional darts player who currently plays in Professional Darts Corporation (PDC) events. He is a Polish Champion and first player from Poland who played at PDC World Darts Championship.

Career
Kciuk is one of the most successful Polish darts players in history. Due to the only national qualification for the PDC World Darts Championship, played in November 2009, he defeated Tomasz Mikołajczyk 6–1 in legs in the final match. In preliminary round he lost 1–4 to Haruki Muramatsu. In the same year, he represented Poland together with Krzysztof Ratajski in the first PDC World Cup of Darts in history. In the first duel with New Zealand, represented by Phillip Hazel and Warren Parry, Poles lost 2–6 in legs.

In February 2013, he played in the 2013 PDC World Cup of Darts with Krzysztof Ratajski, after a really good season at national competitions. In the group stage, the Polish national team faced Gibraltar and Netherlands. 5–2 victory over Gibraltar in the first game guaranteed the qualifying of Poles to the next round despite losing the match with Netherlands. In the second round match, the Poles faced Germany. Poles lost 2–5 in legs. In the following years, Kciuk focused on national competitions and electronic darts. In 2015, he reached his first Polish Championship final, where he lost to Tomasz Kozłowski.

In 2017 reached the quarter-finals at the Polish Open. Good results on the domestic plot guaranteed him a start in the 2017 Winmau World Masters. In first round he defeat Steve Oberg 3–0 in sets. In second round he beat Vladimir Zatko also 3–0 in sets. He was eliminated in the third round by Rod Snow. In September 2017, he almost qualified for the 2018 PDC World Darts Championship, but lost in the final of Eastern Europe Qualifier against Alan Ljubic 2–6 in legs. Few weeks later he reached the semi-finals at the Czech Open, lost match to Martin Phillips.

In 2018, he triumphed in Polish Championship for the first time, beating a promising young star Sebastian Białecki in the final. The triumph in this tournament gave him a start in the 2018 Winmau World Masters. On the way to the final phase, he defeated Robert Nelson, Tommy Wilson, Dean Reynolds and Martijn Kleermaker. Eventually he was eliminated in the fifth round match by Dave Parletti 1–3 in sets. Next day he reached Last 4 of qualifying tournament for a start in the BDO World Darts Championship.

In January 2019, he played at the 2019 BDO World Darts Championship. In preliminary round he beat Brian Løkken 3–1 in sets. In first round, he defeated the favored and seeded Dave Parletti 3–1 in sets. He ended his adventure in the tournament in the second round, losing to Scott Mitchell 0–4 in sets.  Despite regular participation in the Eastern European qualifiers, Kciuk had the privilege of competing in his first PDC European Tour event. In June 2019, he made his debut in 2019 Danish Darts Open, but lost in the first round match to his compatriot Krzysztof Ratajski 3–6 in legs. Kciuk also took part in the 2019 European Darts Matchplay where he also lost in the first round match, but this time he was defeated by Dirk van Duijvenbode 5–6 in legs.

In September 2019, he plays at the 2019 Gibraltar Darts Trophy, where he was able to reach the second round for the first time by beating Kirk Shepherd 6–3 in legs. In the second round match he lost to Rob Cross 3–6 in legs. In the next month, he make his third performance at the 2019 Winmau World Masters. In the first round he beat Michael Meaney 3–1 in sets. Unfortunately, in the second round he meet Dave Parletti for the second time at World Masters and this time lost 0–3 in sets.

On 19 January 2020, Kciuk won a two-year PDC Tour Card by finishing seventh on the European Q School Order of Merit. At the 2020 UK Open he lost 4–6 in legs to Steffen Siepmann in the first round match. After 7 years, in November 2020, he returned at 2020 PDC World Cup of Darts with Krzysztof Ratajski as his partner. Polish team easily defeated the South Africa team in the first round match. In the second round he was defeated by Australia represented by Damon Heta and Simon Whitlock.

In March 2021 he plays at the 2021 UK Open where he won his first match in second round beating Ryan Murray 6–2 in legs. In the second round match Kciuk endured match dart drama, where he missed few chances for doubles against Kim Huybrechts and finally was eliminated. In September 2021, he played in the 2021 PDC World Cup of Darts with Krzysztof Ratajski. For the third time they reached second round, but this time he beat Czech Republic in first round 5–2 in legs, reaching one of the highest ever average in a doubles match in history. In the second round they be defeated after the two singles against Scotland.

Kciuk was not able to achieve good results on the 2021 PDC Pro Tour at the end of the year, so he had to give up his tour card at the end of 2021. Happily, Kciuk regained his PDC Tour Card for next two years by winning the last PDC European Q-School tournament in January 2022. In February he played in the 2022 International Darts Open. He went into second round after a great match beating Rob Cross 1–6 in legs. In the second round he lost to Jonny Clayton 5–6 in legs. He underlined his upward trend by reaching the fourth round at the 2022 UK Open, beating Brett Claydon and Ross Smith. Unfortunately, he lost to Ron Meulenkamp only 9–10 in legs.

In May 2022, he played at the 2022 European Darts Open, where he won his opening game against Keane Barry 6–3 in legs, but lost in the second round to Ryan Searle 2–6 in legs. He qualified for the 2022 Gibraltar Darts Trophy, but withdrew due to unknown reasons.

Personal life
Kciuk is married to Justyna and is a Front-end Developer.

World Championship results

PDC
 2010: Preliminary round (lost to Haruki Muramatsu 1–4) (legs)

BDO
 2019: Second round (lost to Scott Mitchell 0-4) (sets)

Performance timeline

References

External links

1980 births
Living people
Polish darts players
British Darts Organisation players
People from Skarżysko County
Professional Darts Corporation current tour card holders
Sportspeople from Świętokrzyskie Voivodeship
PDC World Cup of Darts Polish team